Stray Dogs is the second album released by the Norwegian singer/songwriter Thomas Dybdahl.

Track listing
"Rain down on me"
"Cecilia"
"Make a mess of yourself"
"Pale green eyes"
"Either way I'm gone"
"Honey"
"Rise in shame"
"Stray dogs"
"The willow"
"Stay home"
"Outro"

Charts

References

2003 albums
Thomas Dybdahl albums